Hamburg (D181) was the lead ship of the Hamburg-class destroyer of the German Navy.

Background 
The Type 101 Hamburg class was the only class of destroyers built during post-war Germany. They were specifically designed to operate in the Baltic Sea, where armament and speed is more important than seaworthiness. They were named after Bundesländer (states of Germany) of West Germany.

The German shipyard Stülcken was contracted to design and build the ships. Stülcken was rather inexperienced with naval shipbuilding, but got the order, since the shipyards traditionally building warships for the German navies like Blohm + Voss, Howaldtswerke or Lürssen were all occupied constructing commercial vessels.

Construction and career
Hamburg was laid down on 29 January 1959 and launched on 26 March 1960 in Hamburg. She was commissioned on 23 March 1964 and decommissioned on 24 February 1994. Finally towed to Spain and scrapped in 1998.

In 1969, the ships of North Atlantic Treaty Organisation Standing Naval Force Atlantic steam into Boston, Massachusetts. The leading ship is the USS McCaffery. The other STANAVFORLANT ships at that time were HMS Dido, Almirante Pereira da Silva, Hamburg, HNLMS Isaac Sweers and HMCS Assiniboine.

In July 1981, Hamburg participated in the 25th anniversary celebration of German naval aviation training in Pensacola, United States.

Gallery

References

Hamburg-class destroyers
1960 ships
Ships built in Hamburg